This is a list of television stations in Kenya. Since Kenya moved from the analog broadcasting system to the digital television system, there has been tremendous growth in the number of television stations. All of the terrestrial stations in Kenya are broadcast via the DVB T2 digital TV signal format.

Television stations in Kenya
MBCI TV
M-CHANNEL TV
TRUTHTV
UTANATV
Africa 24
 Akili Kids! TV
 3 Stones TV
 Ukombozi tv
 El Shaddai tv
CGTN Africa
HOPE TV
AGAPE LOVE TV
Citizen TV
Inooro TV
K24
TV47
LOOK UP TV
Kenya Broadcasting Corporation
Kenya Television Network Home 
NTV
KTN News
Kass TV
Endtime TV
Oracle TV (Oracle Television Network)
Kameme TV
Ebru Television 
voice of victory TV
CHRISTIAN FAITH TV
GIKUYU TV
Shifu TV
Ongatet TV
Weru TV
Oracle TV
Royal TV
KTN Burudani TV
KTN Farmers TV
Ryde TV
5TH Estate
Heaven Bound TV
Mwangaza TV
ZIWA TV, Kenya
Ushirika TV
FUMA TV
RIVERSIDE TV
Pwani TV

ROMANZA TV
 Media of Kenya

References

External links
 DVB T2 signal now on air in Nairobi and its environs. Dvb.org.

 
Kenya